Edward Hale Campbell (October 4, 1872 – December 11, 1946) was a vice admiral in the United States Navy.  He served in the Spanish–American War and World War I.

Early life and education 
Edward Campbell was born in South Bend, Indiana on October 4, 1872 to Myron and Abbie Campbell.

Career 

During the Spanish–American War, he served off the coast of Central America. In 1907, he was named Judge Advocate General of the Navy.

Following this assignment, he would take command of the Naval Training Station, Newport.

He returned to his former position of Judge Advocate General for the years 1925–1929. In 1929, he would take command of the Special Service Squadron. From 1934 to 1935, he served as commander of the Scouting Force. Later, he took command of the 12th Naval District.  He retired on November 1, 1936.

Awards 
He received the Navy Cross for actions during World War I.

Personal life 
He married Lilian Strong. Together, they had 2 children: Georgiana Campbell and Edward S. Campbell.

Death and legacy 
Campbell died in December 11, 1946 in Medina, Washington.  He is buried at Arlington National Cemetery with Lilian and their daughter, Georgiana.

References

1872 births
1946 deaths
People from South Bend, Indiana
United States Navy vice admirals
Judge Advocates General of the United States Navy
Recipients of the Navy Cross (United States)
United States Navy personnel of the Spanish–American War
United States Navy personnel of World War I
United States Naval Academy alumni
Burials at Arlington National Cemetery
Military personnel from Indiana